Charleston Executive Airport  is in Charleston in Charleston County, South Carolina, seven miles southwest of the city. It is owned by the Charleston County Aviation Authority. The airport serves the general aviation community, with no airline service.

History
The airport opened in April 1943 named Johns Island Army Airfield.  Initially it was an auxiliary to Columbia Army Air Base as an unmanned emergency landing airfield.   On 31 March 1944, jurisdiction was transferred to Charleston Army Airfield when Charleston was reassigned to Air Transport Command.   It served as an emergency landing base with no permanent structures being used for transatlantic flights.  On 25 August 1945 the airfield was turned over to local authorities which converted it into a civil airport. The occasional military aircraft still uses the airport.

Facilities
It has two concrete runways:
9/27 is 5,350 by 150 feet (1,631 x 46 m) and 4/22 is 4,313 by 150 feet (1,315 x 46 m).

In the year ending December 11, 2019 the airport had 31,000 aircraft operations, an average of 85 per day. The operations breakdown was: 84% general aviation, 9.5% military, and 6.5% air taxi. 39 aircraft were then based at this airport: 90% single-engine, 5% multi-engine, and 5% jet.

See also

 South Carolina World War II Army Airfields
 List of airports in South Carolina

References

External links
 

Airports in South Carolina
Transportation in Charleston, South Carolina
Airfields of the United States Army Air Forces in South Carolina
1943 establishments in South Carolina
Buildings and structures in Charleston, South Carolina